Maßbach is a market town and municipality in the district of Bad Kissingen in Bavaria in Germany.

Geography
Maßbach lies between the biosphere reserve of the Bavarian Rhön Mountains and Haßberge.

Neighboring municipalities
Münnerstadt
Thundorf
Üchtelhausen in the district of Schweinfurt
Rannungen

Divisions of the municipality
The following towns belong to the municipality:
Maßbach
Rannungen
Thundorf (including the Theinfeld und Rothhausen)

Maßbach includes the following villages:
Poppenlauer
Volkershausen
Weichtungen

History
The town was first documented in 770. Beginning in the mid-19th century many residents of Massbach and the surrounding area emigrated to the United States and settled in Jo Daviess County, Illinois.  They named their settlement in Derinda Township "Massbach" after their home village.

Coat of arms
A red and silver shield divided into alternating stripes emanating from a point at the top.

Sister cities
Bretteville-sur-Laize, near Caen

Culture
The Fränkisches Theater Schloss Maßbach is a private theater which presents an ambitious program. The Heimatmuseum is housed in the palace in Maßbach-Poppenlauer

Transport
There is public bus service to Schweinfurt, Bad Kissingen, and Bad Neustadt. The nearest train station is in Münnerstadt on the Schweinfurt-Erfurt line. The municipality has its own exit from the Autobahn A71.

References

External links
Official website

Bad Kissingen (district)